The Frantics or Frantics is the name of:
The Frantics (Seattle, Washington), an instrumental band from Washington state, a.k.a. "The Four Frantics"
The Frantics (Clinton, South Carolina), a punk rock band
The Frantics (comedy), a Canadian comedy troupe